Gardom is a surname. Notable people with the surname include:

Garde Gardom (1924–2013), Canadian politician and lawyer
Keith Gardom (born 1952), English cricketer
William Gardom (1884—1944), Anglo-Argentine cricket player

See also
Gardam
Gardom's Edge, an area in Derbyshire, England